St Paul's Anglican Church is a heritage-listed Anglican former church building located at 221 Old Northern Road, Castle Hill, The Hills Shire, New South Wales, Australia. It is also known as St Paul's Anglican Church (former) and St Paul's Church (former). The former church was added to the New South Wales State Heritage Register on 2 April 1999.

The current St Paul's Anglican Church, a church in the Diocese of Sydney, has been enlarged and relocated to 421 Old Northern Road, Castle Hill. The contemporary Christian music band, CityAlight is a ministry of the congregation.

History
A church of St Simon was established in the former convict barracks at Castle Hill in 1827. However it closed when a new parish was established in Castle Hill named for St Paul in 1861. The new church building was constructed of brick and was located at 221 Old Northern Road, south of the township, near the corner of Church Street. A sandstone parsonage was constructed opposite the church from materials of the old St Simon's Church. Both buildings remain today and are subject to state and local preservation orders. This church building served the parish until the end of the latter half of the 20th century.

The current larger St Paul's Anglican Church was constructed at Rogans Hill on land owned by the church, adjacent to Oakhill College. The new facilities cater to a congregation of over a 1,000 worshipers.

Heritage listing 
The former St Paul's Anglican Church was listed on the New South Wales State Heritage Register on 2 April 1999.

Gallery

See also 

 Australian non-residential architectural styles
 List of Anglican churches in the Diocese of Sydney

References

Attribution

External links

1860s establishments in Australia
Articles incorporating text from the New South Wales State Heritage Register
Anglican church buildings in Sydney
Castle Hill, New South Wales
Castle Hill